Cladospongia may refer to:
 Cladospongia (Chaonozoa), a genus in the family Codonosigidae
 Cladospongia (sponge), an extinct genus in the family Preperonidellidae